"King George Street" is the fourth and final UK single released from Squeeze's sixth album, Cosi Fan Tutti Frutti. The B-side is a live version of the 1984 Difford & Tilbrook single, "Love's Crashing Waves".

Track listing
7"
 "King George Street" (3:48)
 "Love's Crashing Waves (live)" (4:17)

12"
 "King George Street" (3:48)
 "Love's Crashing Waves (live)" (4:17)
 "Up the Junction (live)" (3:20)

External links
Squeeze discography at Squeezenet

Squeeze (band) songs
1986 singles
Songs written by Glenn Tilbrook
Songs written by Chris Difford